Ramsbottom railway station is a heritage station serving the town of Ramsbottom in Greater Manchester, England.

History
The station was built by the East Lancashire Railway and opened on 28 September 1846. On that date, the line was completed from Clifton Junction through Bury and Ramsbottom to Rawtenstall, enabling through trains to operate from Manchester Victoria.

The line through Ramsbottom had initially been constructed by the Manchester, Bury and Rossendale Railway, authorised on 4 July 1844, but that company was absorbed by the East Lancashire Railway on 21 July 1845.  The line was extended by the ELR from Stubbins Junction, just north of Ramsbottom, to Accrington on 18 September 1848. In turn, the ELR was absorbed by the Lancashire & Yorkshire Railway (LYR) on 13 May 1859.

The station was provided with up and down platforms linked by a footbridge, canopies, and a station building on the down side. A goods yard and goods shed was located on the site of the present car park. The level crossing and signal box still remain in something like their original condition.

Extensive sidings were placed north of the crossing. Those on the down side were largely used for coal traffic, but the ones opposite constituted extensive sorting sidings. Other goods sidings served Trinity Paper works on the east side of the station, and the Square Print Works on the south west side. The latter had a private internal rail system worked by a locomotive called 'Archibald'.

From 1923 the station was operated by the London Midland & Scottish Railway until nationalisation on 1 January 1948, from which date it came under the control of the London Midland Region of British Railways. The station was rationalised from the late 1960s, bringing the demolition of the station buildings and Up platform (used by trains towards Bury). It finally closed to passengers on 5 June 1972, although the line remained open for freight until 1980. It was re-opened by the East Lancashire Railway on 25 July 1987.

The railway station today

The station once again has two platforms, the Up platform having been rebuilt by the ELR since the initial re-opening. They are connected by a footbridge (ex Dinting railway station). A station building containing a ticket office and waiting room has been rebuilt on Platform 2.  Between 2006 and 2007, an L&YR pattern canopy was erected on this platform, providing a covered area next to the station building. On Platform 1, a small waiting shelter is provided. The level crossing remains at the north end of the platforms, and retains its wooden gates which are worked by the traditional 'ship's wheel' in the adjacent signal box.

Gallery

Bibliography

References

External links

Services

Heritage railway stations in the Metropolitan Borough of Bury
Former Lancashire and Yorkshire Railway stations
Railway stations in Great Britain opened in 1846
Railway stations in Great Britain closed in 1972
Railway stations in Great Britain opened in 1987
1846 establishments in England
Beeching closures in England
Ramsbottom